Koigu may refer to several places in Estonia:
Koigu, Valga County, village in Estonia
Koigu, Võru County, village in Estonia